is a city located in Fukuoka, Japan. As of April 1, 2017, the city had a population of 27,544 and a population density of 200 persons per km2. The total area is 139.99 km2.

The modern city of Miyawaka was established in February 11, 2006, from the merger of the towns of Miyata and Wakamiya (both from Kurate District). The new city took its name from portions of the two older town names from which it was formed, Miyata, Wakamiya,

Since February 1991, Toyota Motor Kyushu has been based in Miyawaka, building both Toyota and Lexus models.

A firefly festival is held at Nishikura no Oka Sports Park. At the beginning of June, many fireflies dance around the whole park.

References

External links

 Miyawaka City official website 

Cities in Fukuoka Prefecture